James Turk may refer to:

 James Clinton Turk (1923–2014), Virginia lawyer, judge and state senator
 James L. Turk, Canadian academic and labour leader